Mac & Cheese: The Appetizer (or simply The Appetizer) is an EP mixtape by American rapper French Montana, and produced by Harry Fraud. French Montana's eighteenth mixtape, it was released on December 19, 2014, and is a prequel to, Mac & Cheese: The Album.

Background 
Following the release of his debut album Excuse My French earlier in the year, on November 9, French Montana revealed an early cover art teasing the release of "Mac & Cheese 4" but had not specified whether it would be an album or a mixtape. In an interview with Rolling Stone magazine on January 8, 2014, French confirmed that the record would be his sophomore album to be released later in the year. However, with the album facing delays, on December 8, French Montana announced the release of an EP collaboration with long-time producer Harry Fraud, entitled Mac & Cheese: The Appetizer to be released on December 16. After another round of delays, the mixtape was finally released on December 19 and featured seven tracks.

Critical reception 
The Appetizer received mixed reviews from music critics. Nick Demarco of The E-Fix complimented the production stating "the mixtape sounds great on a technical level" but criticized the tape for being underwhelming, "there really isn’t much to it besides the nice sounds and the parts where French reflects on his childhood and his time with Max B." Max Weinstein of Watchloud.com praised the chemistry between French and producer Harry Fraud noting "his beats complement French’s meandering vocal style, like a bed of drugs for an addict."

Track listing

References

External links 
Music videos
 Poison
 Dontchu

2011 mixtape albums
French Montana albums
Collaborative albums